is a seasonal passenger railway station located in the town of Minami, Tokushima, Japan. It is operated by the Shikoku Railway Company (JR Shikoku).

Lines
The station is open only during the summer beach season in July and August.

Layout
The station consists of one side platform serving one bi-directional track. There is no station building and the station is unattended. The station platform and entrance are located on the coast side, and it is possible to go down directly from the platform to the sandy beach of the adjacent Tainohama beach.

Adjacent stations

History
The station opened on 3 July 1960. With the privatization of Japanese National Railways (JNR) on 1 April 1987, the station came under the control of JR Shikoku.

Surrounding area
Tainohama Beach

See also
 List of Railway Stations in Japan

References

External links

Stations of Shikoku Railway Company
Railway stations in Tokushima Prefecture
Railway stations in Japan opened in 1960
Minami, Tokushima